Takht Ab may refer to:

Takht Ab, Lorestan